Aloys Röhr (18 December 1887 – 1 March 1953) was a German Expressionist sculptor.

Life
Röhr was born in Münster in 1887. He was eldest of the six children of Carl Albert and Gertrud Rohr. He trained as a sculptor in Munster, where he worked for over thirty years.

Röhr died in Albersloh in 1953.

References

1887 births
1953 deaths
People from Münster
German sculptors
German male sculptors